The Treason Act 1695 (7 & 8 Will 3 c 3) is an Act of the Parliament of England which laid down rules of evidence and procedure in high treason trials. It was passed by the English Parliament but was extended to cover Scotland in 1708 and Ireland in 1821. Some of it is still in force today.

Provisions
The Act provided that:
 People accused of treason should have the right to be represented by up to two counsel.
 Nobody could be convicted of treason except by the evidence of two witnesses to the same offence (but not necessarily the same overt act of the offence). (This rule, previously enacted in the Treason Act 1547, the Treason Act 1554 and the Sedition Act 1661, was inherited by the United States and incorporated into Article III, Section 3 of the United States Constitution, which added that both witnesses had to have witnessed the same overt act.)
 Nobody could be prosecuted or punished for treason or misprision of treason unless the indictment was signed by the grand jury within three years of the crime being committed (except in cases of an attempt on the life of the King, or treason outside England and Wales).
 A defendant should be allowed to have a copy of the indictment against him (at his own expense).
 No evidence could be used against him except what was pleaded in the indictment.
However, the Act did not apply to forgery (some kinds of forgery were classed as high treason by the Treason Act 1351), or to petty treason.

History
The Act was passed because previously the law had been extremely harsh, allowing little opportunity for a defendant to defend himself and enabling trumped-up charges of treason to succeed. By the 1680s even the notoriously severe Judge Jeffreys was prepared to admit that it was "hard" that the accused in a treason trial had no right to counsel. However, between 1817 and 1998 the protection of the Act was removed from those accused of treason by assaulting the heir to the throne, or misprision of such treason.

Today most of the Act has been repealed, but the three-year time limit still survives (see below), and of course, the rights to be represented and to have a copy of the indictment (now free of charge) still exist in other legislation. However, the "two witnesses" rule no longer exists in the United Kingdom. In 1800 this rule, and all other special rules of evidence in treason cases, were abolished for cases of killing or attempting to kill the Sovereign. The Treason Act 1842 extended this exception still further, to all attempts to maim or wound the Sovereign (non-lethal assaults on the Sovereign were treason until 1998). Finally, in 1945, the special status of treason was removed for all kinds of treason, and ever since then the evidence required, and the procedure followed, in treason proceedings have been the same as in murder trials.

Repeals

Sections 2 and 4 were repealed in part by the Statute Law Revision Act 1888. The Treason Act 1945 repealed the whole Act, except for sections 5 and 6. Section 5 was repealed in part by the Statute Law Revision Act 1948.

The Act today
The three-year time limit described above – and the original exception to it – are still on the law books today, and are contained in sections 5 and 6 of the Act. (However grand juries were abolished in England in 1933, and now indictments need no longer be signed.) When in 2000 a British newspaper suggested that James Hewitt be prosecuted under the Treason Act 1351 for an alleged affair with Diana, Princess of Wales, it was pointed out that the mooted evidence fell outside the time limit.

See also
High treason in the United Kingdom
Article Three of the US Constitution, section 3
Security of King and Government Act 1695
Treason Act
Treason Act (Ireland) 1765

References
The Treason Act 1695, as amended, from Legislation.gov.uk
'William III, 1695-6: An Act for regulateing of Tryals in Cases of Treason and Misprision of Treason [Chapter III. Rot. Parl. 7 & 8 Gul. III. pt. 1.nu.3.]', Statutes of the Realm: volume 7: 1695-1701 (1820), pp. 6–7. URL: http://www.british-history.ac.uk/report.asp?compid=46810. Date accessed: 16 February 2007.

1695 in law
1695 in England
Treason in England
Acts of the Parliament of England
Acts of the Parliament of England still in force
English criminal law